Golcar United Football Club is a football club based in Golcar, Huddersfield, West Yorkshire, England.

History
Founded in 1904, the club initially played in the Huddersfield & District League. They joined the West Riding County Amateur League in 1934 and were runners-up in their first season in the league. After finishing bottom of the table in 1937–38, the club left the league.

Golcar won the West Riding County Challenge Cup in 2000–01, and were Premier Division runners-up in 2003–04. The following season saw them win the West Riding County Amateur League title. They were runners-up in 2014–15, and champions in 2017–18. They retained the league title the following season, and were promoted to Division One North of the North West Counties League. In 2021–22 they finished third in the league, qualifying for the promotion play-offs. After beating AFC Blackpool in the semi-final, they defeated Holker Old Boys in the final to earn promotion to the Premier Division.

Ground
The club moved to their Longfield Avenue ground in 1955, where the pitch had a noticeable side-to-side slope. Following their promotion to the North West Counties League, floodlights were installed, and were used for the first time on 8 October when the club defeated local rivals Shelley 1–0 in a league match in front of 556 spectators. A 100-seat stand was erected in March 2020.

Honours
West Riding County Amateur League
Premier Division champions 2004–05, 2017–18, 2018–19
West Riding County Challenge Cup
Winners 2000–01
Huddersfield Invitation Cup
Winners 1919–20, 1922–23, 1935–36, 1936–37, 1970–71, 2004–05, 2013–14, 2017–18, 2018–19

Records
Record attendance: 1,204 vs Bury AFC, North West Counties League Division One North, 2 April 2022

See also
Golcar United F.C. players

References

External links

Football clubs in England
Football clubs in West Yorkshire
1904 establishments in England
Association football clubs established in 1904
Huddersfield and District Association Football League
West Riding County Amateur Football League
North West Counties Football League clubs